Saraswati Dey-Saha (born 23 November 1979) is an Indian former track and field sprinter from Chittamara, Belonia Tripura. She holds the current 200 metres national record of 22.82 seconds set at the National Circuit Athletic Meet held in Ludhiana on 28 August 2002. She broke the previous mark held by Rachita Mistry since July 2000. In doing so, Saraswati became the first Indian woman to break 23-second barrier in 200 metres. The highlight of her career was the gold medal she won at the 2002 Busan Asian Games.

Rachita represented India in 4×100 metres relay together with P. T. Usha, E. B. Shyla, and Rachita Mistry at the 1998 Asian Championships in Athletics where her team won the gold medal on way to setting the current national record of 44.43 s. Later in the 4 x 100 metres relay at 2000 Sydney Olympics
her team - consisting of V. Jayalakshmi, Vinita Tripathi, and Rachita Mistry - clocked a time of 45.20 s in the first round. The team finished last in their heats. She also competed in 200 m at 2004 Athens Olympics, where she clocked a time of 23.43 s in the heats.

In 2002, she was conferred the Arjuna Award for her contribution to the Indian athletics. Saraswati quit competitive athletics in July 2006 owing to the injury to her Achilles tendon, occurred after the Busan Asian Games.

National titles
All-India Open National Championships
100 metres: 2000, 2002, 2003
200 metres: 2002, 2003

International competitions

References

External links
 
 

1979 births
Living people
Sportswomen from West Bengal
Sportswomen from Tripura
Indian female sprinters
20th-century Indian women
20th-century Indian people
Olympic athletes of India
Athletes (track and field) at the 2000 Summer Olympics
Athletes (track and field) at the 2004 Summer Olympics
Asian Games gold medalists for India
Asian Games medalists in athletics (track and field)
Athletes (track and field) at the 2002 Asian Games
Recipients of the Arjuna Award
Medalists at the 2002 Asian Games
Olympic female sprinters